Tropidophorus partelloi, Partello's waterside skink, is a species of skink. It is endemic to the Philippines.

References 

partelloi
Reptiles described in 1910
Reptiles of the Philippines
Taxa named by Leonhard Stejneger